Coco Loco Dance Mix is an EP by Mexican pop singer Daniela Romo. This album was released on 1986. It was a maxi single from the original song "Coco loco", which was included in her album Mujer de todos, Mujer de nadie.

Track listing
Tracks:
 Coco loco (Dance Mix)
 Coco loco (Love Mix)
 Coco loco (Original Version)
 Coco loco (Voiceless remix)

References

Daniela Romo albums
1986 EPs